Ghostbusters (initially marketed simply as Ghostbusters: Answer the Call) is a 2016 American supernatural comedy film directed by Paul Feig from a screenplay he co-wrote with Katie Dippold. Starring Melissa McCarthy, Kristen Wiig, Kate McKinnon, Leslie Jones, Neil Casey, Charles Dance, Michael K. Williams, Andy García, Cecily Strong, and Chris Hemsworth,  it is a reboot of the 1984 film of the same name and the third film in the Ghostbusters franchise. The story focuses on four eccentric women (and their incompetent assistant) who are interested in parapsychology and start a ghost-catching business in New York City.

A third Ghostbusters film had been in various stages of development following the release of Ghostbusters II in 1989. Because of original cast member Bill Murray's refusal to commit to the project, and the death of fellow cast member Harold Ramis in 2014, Sony decided to reboot the series instead. Many of the original film's cast members and their family members make cameo appearances in new roles, and Ramis is commemorated in the film's closing credits. The announcement of the female-led cast in 2015 drew a polarized response from the public and an internet backlash, leading to the film's IMDb page and associated YouTube videos receiving low ratings before the film's release.

Produced by Columbia Pictures in association with Village Roadshow Pictures, the film premiered at the TCL Chinese Theatre in Los Angeles on July 9, 2016, and was released in the United States on July 15, in IMAX, 4DX, 3D, Real D 3D and IMAX 3D. The film received generally positive reviews from critics, with praise for the cast, direction, humor, and visuals, but criticism for the script and CGI on the ghosts. The film grossed $229 million worldwide against its $144 million budget, making it a box office bomb with losses of over $70 million following theaters taking their revenue cut. Columbia abandoned plans for a sequel, opting instead to continue the original film canon with Ghostbusters: Afterlife (2021).

Plot

Particle physicists and estranged friends Abby Yates and Erin Gilbert co-authored Ghosts from Our Past, a book detailing their investigations of the paranormal since high school. Erin later disowned the work, while Abby continues her research at an inadequate research college, the Kenneth P. Higgins Institute of Science in New York City, with engineering physicist Jillian Holtzmann as her partner. Erin, now a professor at Columbia University, is in line for tenure when she discovers that Abby republished their book. Erin convinces her to cease its publication if she helped Abby and Jillian at an alleged haunted house. They encounter a malevolent ghost before she escapes, restoring Erin's belief in the supernatural and friendship with Abby. Erin loses her bid for tenure at Columbia after their vlog becomes viral. She offers to join Abby and Jillian, but the dean of the Higgins Institute fires them as well. After stealing equipment, they establish temporary headquarters above a Chinese restaurant. They verbosely name themselves "Conductors of the Metaphysical Examination", build trappings and hire jock Kevin Beckman as a receptionist.

Metropolitan Transportation Authority (MTA) staffer Patty Tolan encounters a ghost in a subway terminal built under a haunted prison in Auburn and contacts the team. They find the ghost and test Jillian's prototype for the proton packs on the entity but fail to capture it. They advertise their services with a "no ghosts allowed" logo that Jillian used based on a graffiti artist's defacement, and the name pundits have labeled them—"Ghostbusters". Patty joins the team, providing extensive knowledge of New York City, rail personal protective equipment, and a repurposed hearse from her mortician uncle Bill Jenkins, named "Ecto-1".

The supernatural events have been triggered by mad scientist Rowan North, an occultist with a god complex who attracts ghosts over Manhattan with self-developed ionizers that correspond to the Ghostbusters' technology, allowing him to experiment and create a dimensional vortex powered by turned PSI energy. When Rowan plants another device at a concert, the Ghostbusters are called and capture a gargoyle-like spirit there, becoming city sensations but antagonizing Rowan. While debunker Dr. Martin Heiss challenges the quartet, Erin releases the ghost as proof; it throws him out of a window and escapes. The Ghostbusters are brought to Mayor Bradley and his deputy Jennifer Lynch, who reveal that they and the Department of Homeland Security (DHS) are aware of the city's supernatural activities. While privately acknowledging the team's work, they publicly denounce them as fraudsters.

The Ghostbusters realize Rowan is planting his devices along ley lines, with their alignments intersecting at the Mercado Hotel in Times Square, a site of violent occurrences. They find that Rowan's vortex will breach a ghostly dimension at the intersection, potentially triggering an apocalypse. During a confrontation, Abby warns Rowan that he will be going to jail, but Rowan, not wanting to turn himself in, electrocutes himself with his main machine, after which Jillian deactivates it. Jillian then finds an annotated copy of Ghosts from Our Past in Rowan's underground laboratory, explaining the similarity between their technologies. Erin later discovers that Rowan planned to commit suicide so he could become a ghost himself. Rowan returns as a deity-like ghost and attempts to kill the Ghostbusters at their headquarters by possessing Abby, but Patty stops him. He then possesses Kevin and escapes to the hotel, opening the portal and releasing galvanized ghosts. The authorities are subdued, but the Ghostbusters fight through Rowan's spectral army to reach the portal.

After leaving Kevin, Rowan asks the quartet what form they would like him to appear as. When Patty suggests a ghost, Rowan appears as the ghost in the Ghostbusters' logo, grows to a kaiju-like size, and goes on a rampage. The team turns Ecto-1's reactor as a makeshift bomb, detonating a nuclear explosion inside the vortex. This reverses the portal and forces Rowan and the ghosts back in, restoring the city. Rowan tries to drag Abby with him in retaliation, but Erin leaps into the portal and rescues her.

Despite the city's fascination with the supernatural and lauding the Ghostbusters as heroes, the mayor's office continues to denounce them publicly but covertly funds their operations. With new resources, the Ghostbusters move to a disused firehouse, where they build more equipment, including an ecto-containment system. While investigating electronic voice phenomenon (EVP), Patty hears the word "Zuul".

Cast

 Melissa McCarthy as Dr. Abigail L. "Abby" Yates
 Kristen Wiig as Dr. Erin Gilbert
 Kate McKinnon as Dr. Jillian "Holtz" Holtzmann
 Leslie Jones as Patricia "Patty" Tolan
 Chris Hemsworth as Kevin Beckman
 Neil Casey as Dr. Rowan North
 Andy García as Mayor Bradley
 Cecily Strong as Jennifer Lynch
 Michael K. Williams as Agent Hawkins
 Matt Walsh as Agent Rourke
 Charles Dance as Dr. Harold Filmore
 Ed Begley Jr. as Ed Mulgrave Jr.

Original Ghostbusters cast members appear in the film:

 Bill Murray as paranormal-debunker Dr. Martin Heiss
 Dan Aykroyd as a taxi driver who is oddly well-versed with the parapsychology, much like the Ghostbusters. Aykroyd also contributed as an executive producer.
 Ernie Hudson as Patty's uncle, Bill Jenkins, who works as a mortician 
 Sigourney Weaver as Holtzmann's mentor, Dr. Rebecca Gorin
 Annie Potts as hotel-receptionist Vanessa

Also, original director and producer Ivan Reitman has a cameo as a passerby, while original cast member Harold Ramis' son Daniel cameos as a metalhead. Ramis' likeness is used on a bust outside Gilbert's office.

Karan Soni, Bess Rous, Eugene Cordero, and Milana Vayntrub, who co-starred with Casey on director Paul Feig's series Other Space, portray deliveryman Benny, the ghost of Gertrude Aldridge, a bass guitarist, and a woman attacked by rat ghosts. Brian Baumgartner has a cameo appearance as hotel guest Frank the Mercado in the extended cut.

Also appearing as ghosts are Dave Allen as the electrocuted ghost, Steve Bannos as the flasher ghost, Robin Shelby as the voice of Lady Slimer, and Adam Ray as the voice of Slimer, who also portrays the lead singer of a band. Former Saturday Night Live writer Steve Higgins plays Thomas Shanks, while his son, Saturday Night Live star John Higgins plays the Baba Booey Shouter. Michael McDonald plays Jonathan, Zach Woods plays Garett, Nate Corddry plays Leif, Toby Huss plays Officer Stevenson, Katie Dippold plays a rental agent, Sam Richardson plays a police officer, and Jessica Chaffin and Jamie Denbo play waitresses. Ozzy Osbourne, Al Roker, Pat Kiernan, Greg Kelly, Rosanna Scotto, and Chris Gethard portray themselves.

Production

Development
A third Ghostbusters film had been in various stages of development following the release of Ghostbusters II in 1989. Bill Murray, who played Ghostbuster Peter Venkman in the original films, was reluctant to participate. He felt Ghostbusters II was lackluster and was critical of the new scripts he had read. Murray later clarified that his reluctance was due in part to his relationship with Columbia Pictures and Sony, rather than any of his co-stars from the first two films. Dan Aykroyd, who co-starred in and co-wrote the original films, said the studio was aware that "without Murray there may be nothing there" for a sequel, and was considering a way to introduce a new generation of Ghostbusters.

One script, Ghostbusters 3: Hellbent, written by Aykroyd in 1999, had Venkman leaving the Ghostbusters to spend time with Sigourney Weaver's character Dana Barrett; the remaining Ghostbusters, including a new younger member, fought souls evicted from a hellish version of Manhattan known as Manhelltan. The Hellbent script was revised as Ghostbusters in Hell, with plans to replace Murray with Ben Stiller. The story had the Ghostbusters finding a portal to an alternate dimension where "all the worst things about modern urban life" are "magnified"; traffic is stuck in perpetual gridlock, and nobody speaks the same language. Another story idea had Venkman transformed into a ghost.

While the third film remained in development, Terminal Reality developed Ghostbusters: The Video Game and released it in 2009. Aykroyd and Harold Ramis, cowriters of the original films, used the game to explore the Ghostbusters history. The four original actors, including Murray, voiced their characters, along with other actors from the original films. Aykroyd considered the game "essentially the third movie". The game sold over a million units, prompting Columbia Pictures to move forward with the Ghostbusters franchise. Ramis said the new film would feature the original Ghostbusters but introduce new characters in a script written by Lee Eisenberg and Gene Stupnitsky, co-writers of his 2009 comedy Year One. The film was to be filmed in 2010 and released in 2011.

Around March 2010, while the new script was being developed, Vulture reported Columbia wanted to target a younger audience and that original Ghostbusters director Ivan Reitman was under pressure to step down in place of a younger director. Reitman, along with Murray, Aykroyd, and Ramis, had long-standing contracts in place with Columbia that effectively allowed any of them to veto the development of a Ghostbusters film. Murray told GQ that he felt the script written by Eisenberg and Stupnitsky was poor and "that dream just vaporized", but said that Columbia was pressuring him to make it. Aykroyd defended the script, saying it offered Murray "the comic role of a lifetime". In January 2012, Aykroyd revealed that the film was in "suspended animation" as Murray was still uncooperative. Aykroyd refused to recast the role as he would not make a film that "exploits the franchise". By July, the Eisenberg and Stupnitsky script had been discarded and new writers were working on a script.

Murray's reluctance to commit to the project resulted in the decision to reboot the franchise instead. In September, Reitman suggested a remake of the original Ghostbusters, which would allow them to introduce a new cast. Reitman was working on a Ghostbusters reboot that would be written by Reitman, Etan Cohen, and Aykroyd and filmed in 2013. Following Ramis's death in February 2014, Reitman left the director's role to focus on smaller projects, but remained a producer to help Columbia and Sony find a new director. At this point, the script featured the original Ghostbusters in minor roles.

Pre-production
In August 2014, Paul Feig was selected as director, with the plans featuring an all-female cast in the reboot. Feig announced the film and his involvement, along with co-writer Katie Dippold, in October, and confirmed his intention to have "hilarious women" star in the film. He added the TV series The Walking Dead partly inspired him, and his goal was to "tell a story you haven't seen before. Or tell a story you've seen before, but in a way you haven't seen it".

Feig said that Sony Pictures Entertainment's co-chairman Amy Pascal had been pushing for comedy writers to produce a script for a new Ghostbusters film for some time. He believed that most of these writers, like himself, did not want to ruin the original film's canon. He also wanted to avoid a premise similar to Ghostbusters II, where the Ghostbusters have to lose their success to begin a new story. This led to the idea of a reboot featuring a new set of characters, an idea that Pascal supported.

Casting
In January 2015, Feig confirmed his intention to use Kristen Wiig, Melissa McCarthy, Kate McKinnon, and Leslie Jones in the lead roles. At that point, McCarthy had already committed to the film while Sony was in negotiations with the other actresses. Emma Stone was approached to star, but declined in part because she did not want to commit to a franchise. Cecily Strong, who appears in a supporting role, was also considered for a leading role. Aykroyd said he and his family were "delighted" that "these most magnificent women in comedy" had inherited "the Ghostbusters torch".

Bill Murray has a cameo role in the film. In a 2019 interview, he said his decision to participate in the film was because of his friendships with McCarthy and McKinnon, and he felt it was important to support their project.

Filming
Principal photography began on June 17, 2015, in Boston. Feig and the set dressers Carolyn Lassek and Claudia Bonfe consulted with MIT physicists on set details before shooting. Filming took place in Boston's Chinatown for a few days in early July. Hemsworth was spotted filming some scenes on the Ghostbusters bike in August. After finishing at the old Naval Air Station in South Weymouth, Massachusetts, filming began in Tribeca in New York City on September 12. Three days later, filming took place in Waltham, Massachusetts, and then outside of Columbia University in New York. Filming wrapped on September 19 in New York City. The subway scenes were filmed on a sound stage, as there is no Seward Street station in the New York City Subway. Reshoots took place in Los Angeles in May 2016, and included new scenes that served as a metafictional comment on the internet controversy the film aroused.

Effects
Six companies dealt with the 1,700 visual effects shots, under the supervision of Pete Travers. The main studios were Sony Pictures Imageworks, with 300 shots that included the climactic Times Square sequence and all the proton beams. Moving Picture Company (MPC), had 250 shots that centered on the final battle which included Rowan's monster form. The Australian company Iloura, worked with 500 shots encompassing various ghosts. While most of the work involved computer-generated imagery, there was an attempt to use various practical effects akin to the original movies, with Travers explaining it was done "not to pay homage, but because it was the best way to achieve the effect".

Stand-ins for the ghosts were created on the set for the actors to interact with. These included actresses suspended by wires, drones as references for flying ghosts, a Slimer puppet and giant balloons for a Stay Puft Marshmallow Man parade balloon. As the ghosts in the film glow, the doubles were covered in light-emitting diodes to provide lighting references for the effects crew.

The climactic Times Square sequence, which starts with the antagonist proclaiming, "Welcome to the glory days of New York City", used special effects to transform it into a bygone mix of stores, buildings and billboards dating back through the decades. These included the Bond Clothing Store, neon signs for the defunct airlines Braniff International Airways (ended in 1982) and BOAC (ended in 1974), billboards advertising the release of the 1976 film Taxi Driver, the 1971 film Isle of the Snake People, and the 1962 to 1964 Broadway theatre production of Beyond the Fringe. The scene also included a combination of the Sony, Canadian Club, and Coca-Cola neon signs that lit up Times Square in different eras, marquees for the long departed Times Square movie theaters showing pornographic films and the 1971 film Fists of Fury, and other chronological anachronisms.

Following a test done by stereoscopic supervisor Ed Marsh, Feig decided to take a different approach to the 3D effects, as the movie was letterboxed even in theaters, so that some objects, mostly regarding the ghosts manifesting themselves, would reach beyond the black bars.

Music

The film soundtrack album, Ghostbusters: Original Motion Picture Soundtrack, was released by RCA Records on July 15, 2016. Four versions of "Ghostbusters" are included on this soundtrack, each performed by Walk the Moon, Pentatonix, Fall Out Boy featuring Missy Elliott, and the original by Ray Parker Jr. The film score, composed by Theodore Shapiro, was released via digital download on July 8, and CD on July 15 by Sony Classical Records.

Charts

Controversy
Ghostbusters received criticism on social media following word of Feig's involvement and the all-female cast, which some felt was a "gimmick". On its first day of release, the first trailer for the film collected 12,000 "likes" and 13,800 "dislikes" from YouTube viewers which, according to David Griner of Ad Week made it "one of the most polarizing in recent memory". By May 2016, the trailer had become the most disliked film trailer on YouTube, and the ninth-most-disliked YouTube video, with 280,000 likes to over one million dislikes. ScreenCrush described the reaction as a campaign "to downvote [the film] into oblivion" by "a certain subset of people on the internet [with] an unhealthy fixation with hating on the Ghostbusters remake". In one interview, Melissa McCarthy felt it was a "very, very, very tiny, tiny group of people" who were misogynistic. Other reasons proposed for the negative reaction to the trailer included a lack of interest in reboots, nostalgia for the original film and a perceived lack of humor in the trailer. The film's IMDb page was also subject to a coordinated effort to lower its rating before the film's release. Some media outlets dubbed it "The Female Ghostbusters".

Todd Martens of the Los Angeles Times suggested fans felt "entitled" to a film that preserved the original as they imagined it. In an interview with Mashable, Ivan Reitman said, "I think there's way too much talk about gender [when it comes to this film]", and "I think that many of the people who were complaining were actually lovers of the [original] movie, not haters of women". Some saw the portrayal of Leslie Jones' character, a "street-smart New Yorker", as a stereotype of African Americans. Jones responded to this criticism on Twitter writing: "Why can't a regular person be a Ghostbuster?" Elizabeth Flock, writing for PBS, said that racism toward Jones may have motivated the vote brigading targeted at the film.

Journalists from The Washington Post and The Atlantic claimed a majority of the criticism constituted misogynistic and anti-feminist comments about the female cast. Wiig was "bummed out" that "there was so much controversy because we were women". Feig said he believed a group of fans had "real issues with women. But there's also a huge group of people who are just concerned about the property, and I completely understand. I'm completely sympathetic to that". In May 2016, additional scenes were shot for the film, which served as a meta-reference to the controversy. In those scenes, the characters upload a video to YouTube and react to unpleasant comments left by viewers.

Filmmaker James Rolfe, creator of the web series "Angry Video Game Nerd", declared that he would not see the new film and disliked how it was based in a new universe with no continuity with the previous films. Brooks Barnes of The New York Times and Daniel Friedman of Polygon considered Rolfe's views an example of "fan entitlement", criticizing his haste to judge the film without seeing it and his lack of concern for other remakes of films he admired, such as Teenage Mutant Ninja Turtles. Rolfe received personal attacks online for his position; according to commentators for The Washington Post, Salon, and Polygon, though Rolfe had not mentioned gender, some people considered his motivation misogynistic. Richard Roeper's negative review of the film was also met with criticism on social media and from Salon, who accused him of male bias. Roeper responded: "How insulting would it be to give a film a pass because of good intentions and diversity in the casting? That's not equal treatment; that's condescension". Journalists from The Atlantic and NBC News saw the controversy as part of the culture war and gender divide engaged across social media. They, along with Feig, noted commonalities to the events and reactions of the Gamergate controversy in video games.

Following the release of the film, cast member Leslie Jones became the target of racist and sexist abuse on Twitter. A number of users, including Feig, showed support for Jones and criticized Twitter's handling of the situation. Feig was highly critical to the haters on his tweet. On July 19, Twitter suspended the account of then Breitbart writer Milo Yiannopoulos, who had criticized Jones, allegedly for abusive behavior over the previous 48 hours. Conversely, Jones and her character in the film were also accused of promoting negative stereotypes about black people.

In November 2017, Feig expressed regret that the social issues surrounding Ghostbusters affected its public perception and commercial performance. He defended the film, saying: "It was a great regret in my life that the movie didn't do better, 'cause I really loved it. It's not a perfect movie. None of my movies are perfect. I liked what we were doing with it. It was only supposed to be there to entertain people".

In 2018, while promoting the all-female led film Ocean's 8, Sandra Bullock said the reaction that Ghostbusters received was "unfair on a level that I can't even not be mad about talking about. They literally walked into a firing squad. You had five of the most gifted comedian actresses on the planet — I'm just gonna leave it at that. And it doesn't just take five people to make a movie. It takes about 300, so, you know what? Let's back off the meanness. Let's have a year of kindness. The women are here — we're not going anywhere. But this isn't about just women. We like sitting at the table with men. We just want to be invited to their table as well because we like them at our table".

Release
Ghostbusters premiered at the TCL Chinese Theatre in Los Angeles on July 9, 2016. It was theatrically released on July 11 in the United Kingdom and on July 15 in the United States. The film was not released in the Chinese market. A Chinese executive reported that China Film Group Corporation believed it was "not really that attractive to Chinese audiences. Most of the Chinese audience didn't see the first and second movies, so they don't think there's much market for it here".

Marketing
The first Ghostbusters trailer was released on March 3, 2016. It was viewed 24 million times in 24 hours on Facebook and YouTube, and more than 60 million times across all social media platforms in its first week.

Original Ghostbusters cast members Murray, Aykroyd, Hudson and Potts joined the new cast on the June 8 episode of Jimmy Kimmel Live!, which was entirely dedicated to the new film.

Sony partnered with Snapchat to promote the film with "busting" and "sliming" features. The filter, which features the Ghostbusters logo, allows users to shoot at the character Slimer with their front-facing cameras and a virtual proton pack. In addition, 10-second video teaser ads ran within Snapchat's Discover section.
Tor Books published a novelization of the film, written by Nancy Holder.

Title
The end credits use the title Ghostbusters: Answer the Call. Feig said this was added by the studio, which wanted to avoid confusion by having two films with the title Ghostbusters. He rejected the title Ghostbusters 2016, feeling it would date it. The studio chose Answer the Call; according to Feig: "I just said, 'Don't put it on the front of the movie. If you put it on the end, I don't care'".

Home media
Ghostbusters was released on DVD, Blu-ray, Blu-ray 3D and Ultra HD Blu-ray on October 11, 2016. The release includes the extended cut of the film, which incorporates over 17 minutes of some deleted scenes:
 One scene shows Erin being ridiculed as a "ghost girl" on the street, which leads to her punching the bully.
 Scenes establishing Erin wanting recognition in the scientific community and thus her dedication to ghost hunting.
 Additional scenes to flesh out the background of Rowan and why he wanted to unleash ghosts. Notably, in this scene it is revealed that most ghosts are men.
 In the final battle, one attempt to end the standoff by "crossing the streams" (as in the original film), which does not work.
 Several dancing scenes, including one around the film's climax.

In December 2021, director Paul Feig's film was omitted from publicity material for an announced eight-disc boxed set titled Ghostbusters Ultimate Collection containing all other Ghostbusters films in the franchise up to 2021 for release in February 2022. Feig considered this "a mistake […] So, I guess this was just an oversight?" by the distributors.

Reception

Box office
Ghostbusters grossed $128.3 million in North America and $100.8 million in other territories for a worldwide total of $229.1 million, with a net production budget of $144 million. Because of the large amount spent on marketing, the studio stated the film would need to gross at least $300 million to break even. Before the release, director Paul Feig said: "A movie like this has to at least get to like $500 million worldwide, and that's probably low".

The Hollywood Reporter estimated the film's financial losses would be over $70 million. A representative of Sony found this loss estimate to be "way off": "With multiple revenue streams ... the bottom line, even before co-financing, is not even remotely close to that number". According to Variety, sources familiar with the film's financing estimate the total loss to be about $75 million, of which, due to co-financing with Village Roadshow, Sony would lose about $50 million. Sony insiders have projected, along with co-financing, a total loss of about $25 million. Bloomberg News estimated the film lost $58.6 million. By August 2016, sources such as Forbes and The Wall Street Journal had begun calling Ghostbusters a box office bomb. The film's performance contributed to Sony taking a $1 billion writedown in January 2017.

In the United States and Canada, the film opened Friday, July 15, across 3,963 theaters, and was projected to gross $40–50 million in its first weekend. It earned $17.2 million on its first day, including $3.4 million it made from Thursday preview screenings, later going on to earn $46 million in its opening weekend, finishing second at the box office behind The Secret Life of Pets ($50.8 million). It procured the biggest opening weekend ever for director Feig and star Melissa McCarthy and was the biggest live-action comedy debut since Pitch Perfect 2 in May 2015. In its second weekend, the film dropped 54% to $21 million (compared to the first film increasing in its sophomore week by 11%), dropping to fifth at the box office.

Outside North America, Ghostbusters earned $19.1 million in its opening weekend from a handful of markets on 3,900 screens. IMAX contributed $1 million from 105 IMAX screens. It had number one openings in the United Kingdom and Republic of Ireland ($6.1 million), number one in Australia ($3.7 million), and number three in Brazil ($2.2 million). It debuted at number one on the DVD and Blu-ray charts after its release on home media in North America.

In a June 2017 television appearance, Aykroyd blamed the film's underperformance on Feig. According to Aykroyd, Feig refused to shoot additional scenes requested by Aykroyd and Sony until test screenings demonstrated they were necessary, costing an additional $30–40 million in reshoots (although Sony claimed reshoots only cost $3–4 million). He wrote a few days later: "Paul Feig made a good movie and had a superb cast and plenty of money to do it. We just wish he had been more inclusive to the originators. It cost everyone as it is unlikely Kristen, Leslie, Melissa and Kate will ever reprise their roles as Ghostbusters which is sad".

Critical response
The website's critical consensus reads, "Ghostbusters does an impressive job of standing on its own as a freewheeling, marvelously cast supernatural comedy—even if it can't help but pale somewhat in comparison with the classic original". On Metacritic, the film has a score of 60 out of 100, based on 52 critics, indicating "mixed or average reviews". Audiences surveyed by CinemaScore gave the film an average grade of "B+" on an A+ to F scale, while those surveyed by PostTrak gave a 57% "definite recommend".

Manohla Dargis of The New York Times praised the film as "that rarest of big-studio offerings—a movie that is a lot of enjoyable, disposable fun". In The Guardian, Nigel M. Smith awarded the film four out of five and wrote that the "mean-spirited reception to the film before anyone had seen it does not seem to have put a dampener on the movie itself. Fun oozes from almost every frame; likewise the energy of a team excited to be revolutionising the blockbuster landscape". Mike Ryan of Uproxx gave the film a positive review, praising the characters but feeling CGI was overused. J.R. Kinnard of PopMatters praised the performances and the lack of cynicism, but concluded "it feels like a safe, flavorless recipe prepared from gourmet ingredients". The Village Voice said the film "suffers from the anxiety of influence" of the original, but praised the actors. Mara Reinstein of US Weekly gave the film 2.5 out of 4, commending its actors but criticizing its "lazy script that takes forever to get going" and "uninspired" action sequences.

Observer critic Mark Kermode awarded the film three out of five and wrote: "It would have been great to report that the finished film is good enough to shut the bigoted naysayers up once and for all ... The harsh truth is that it isn't". He felt that the film was "generally likeable but uneven". Richard Lawson, writing for Vanity Fair, said the film "spends so much time doing battle with its legacy that it forgets to be its own movie, putting a talented cast to waste and marking another disappointment in this dreadful summer movie season". James Berardinelli felt it was mediocre, and, like many recent comedies, "too long and not funny enough". Richard Roeper of the Chicago Sun-Times gave the film one out of four, criticizing its acting, script, and "cheesy" special effects. In his radio review, Roeper said that the film was one of the worst movies of the year, rating it a D−.

Accolades

Future

Canceled sequel

After its opening weekend, Sony's president of worldwide distribution, Rory Bruer, told TheWrap that "while nothing has been officially announced, there's no doubt in [his] mind [a sequel] will happen". He also said that Ghostbusters was expected to become an important Sony franchise. The principal cast and Feig had signed on for two sequels.

Some tabloids, such as The Hollywood Reporter, expressed doubts about a sequel because of the film's box office performance. Box office analyst Jeff Bock said: "I just can't fathom the creative talents behind it—Feig, McCarthy, Wiig, etc—slogging out another one when the reception to the first one was so mediocre".

In an October interview the same year, Feig told Bustle that a sequel was not in the works, but could be possible if the film performed well on its home release. By November, Feig confirmed that a direct sequel would not be made due to the film's mediocre box office performance.

Possible animated series and film
The same month, Reitman said in an interview that other Ghostbusters projects were in development. Before Reitman's announcement, an animated series, Ghostbusters: Ecto Force, was slated to be targeting an early 2018 debut. Reitman further clarified plans for future animated films within the Ghostbusters franchise during the July 2017 San Diego Comic-Con, including having one set from the viewpoint of the ghosts rather than the Ghostbusters, and a work as a potential tie-in to the 35th anniversary of the original film in 2019.

Comic book series
IDW Publishing released a six-part limited series comic, Ghostbusters 101, featuring the original Ghostbusters teaming up with the 2016 team. The first issue was released in March 2017. A five-issue limited series, Ghostbusters: Answer the Call, which continues the adventures of the 2016 team, began in October.

Ghostbusters: Afterlife

In November 2018, during an appearance on AXS TV's The Big Interview with Dan Rather, Dan Aykroyd announced that the script for Ghostbusters 3 was still being written, saying there is "a possibility of a reunion with the three remaining Ghostbusters".

In 2019, Ivan Reitman's son Jason was confirmed to be directing a new Ghostbusters film set in the same universe as the first two films, with Ivan serving as a producer and Gil Kenan co-writing the script with Jason. The film was projected for a July 10, 2020 release, but was delayed to March 5, 2021, because of the COVID-19 pandemic. The film was eventually pushed back to November 19, 2021. Feig and the cast of the 2016 movie were not involved with the 2019 film.

Video games
Eventually, all four of the newer Ghostbusters were added to the toys-to-life game Lego Dimensions as playable characters featured in a Story Pack with a new design for the portal, six new levels to play which retell the story, and access to playing as Abby Yates, but also Erin Gilbert, Jillian Holtzmann and Patty Tolan if the player completes the story mode for Ghostbusters 2016.

Literature
 2016: Nancy Holder: GHOSTBUSTERS novelization, Macmillan USA, 
 2016: Stacia Deutsch: Ghostbusters Movie Novelization, Simon Spotlight,

See also
 List of ghost films

References

External links

 
 
 
 
 

2016 comedy films
2016 films
2010s buddy comedy films
2010s fantasy comedy films
2010s ghost films
2010s feminist films
2010s female buddy films
2010s American films
2010s monster movies
2016 3D films
American fantasy comedy films
American ghost films
American supernatural comedy films
American comedy horror films
American female buddy films
American feminist comedy films
American 3D films
Australian comedy films
Advertising and marketing controversies in film
Casting controversies in film
Film controversies in the United States
YouTube controversies
Columbia Pictures films
Cultural depictions of Ozzy Osbourne
2010s English-language films
Films about social media
Films about spirit possession
Films about terrorism
Films about writers
Films directed by Paul Feig
Films produced by Amy Pascal
Films produced by Ivan Reitman
Films scored by Theodore Shapiro
Films set in hotels
Films set in Manhattan
Films set in New York City
Films set in Columbia University
Films shot in Boston
Films shot in Massachusetts
Films shot in New York City
Films with screenplays by Katie Dippold
Films with screenplays by Paul Feig
Ghostbusters films
IMAX films
Mad scientist films
Reboot films
The Montecito Picture Company films
Village Roadshow Pictures films
4DX films